The 1994 AFC U-16 Championship is the sixth edition of the tournament, organized by the Asian Football Confederation (AFC) every two years.

Qualification

Qualified teams:
 
 
 
 

  
 
 
 
 (host)

Group stage

Group A

Group B

Knockout stage

Semifinals

Third-place match

Final

Winners

Teams qualified for 1995 FIFA U-17 World Championship

Sources
rsssf.com

Under
International association football competitions hosted by Qatar
1994–95 in Qatari football
1994 in youth association football
AFC U-16 Championships
AFC U-16 Championships